Bogouiné is a town in western Ivory Coast. It is a sub-prefecture of Man Department in Tonkpi Region, Montagnes District.

Bogouiné was a commune until March 2012, when it became one of 1126 communes nationwide that were abolished.

In 2014, the population of the sub-prefecture of Bogouiné was 15,172.

Villages
The fifteen villages of the sub-prefecture of Bogouiné and their population in 2014 are:

Notes

Sub-prefectures of Tonkpi
Former communes of Ivory Coast